Marc Reichert (born March 22, 1980) is a Swiss professional ice hockey player. He is currently playing for the SC Bern of Switzerland's National League A (NLA).

References

External links

1980 births
Living people
HC Ambrì-Piotta players
SC Bern players
EHC Biel players
EHC Kloten players
Swiss ice hockey forwards
People from Burgdorf, Switzerland
Ice hockey people from Bern